GlobalDoodle was a website which allowed users to draw, either individually or collaboratively in real time, on a giant, digital piece of paper measuring 16 km2.

History
Development on globalDoodle started in October 2010, launching a 6-week beta testing period in March 2011. The launch team consisted of Helmut Eder and Neil Domselaar.

The site came out of beta testing and officially launched on 3 May 2011. The site was closed down in 2015.

Site Overview
Designed by Helmut Eder and Neil Domselaar, globalDoodle went live in May 2011. It does not require a registration or log-in and allows people to express what they feel. The designs can be locked or left open to allow others to contribute. Each design has a unique code so it can easily be found and shared. Inspiration for globalDoodle came from the thought of "getting everyone on the same page" and allowing artistic expression (and scribbles as well) to be shared with the world.

One of the characteristics that sets globalDoodle apart is the use of the HTML5 standard to allow drawing natively in the browser without the need for browser plug-ins.

Reception
In its first year of activity after launch, globalDoodle was visited approximately 27,000 times; 58 km of doodles were created, filling 558 square meters of the page.

References

Sources

External links
globalDoodle 

Online companies of Australia
Internet properties established in 2011